The Nameless Knight is a 1970 Turkish historical fantasy film directed by Halit Refiğ and starring Cüneyt Arkın, Nebahat Çehre, Pouri Banayi, Birsen Ayda, and Altan Günbay.

Plot
A young hero, popularly known as "The Nameless Knight", struggles against the tyrannical ruler of Bukhara. The ruler learns that he will be given divine punishment for his wicked deeds and will be killed by his own son. He orders a female to drown his baby son in the river soon after birth but he is left in a basket to float and survives. When the son grows up, he is compelled to kill his father.

Cast
Cüneyt Arkın as Adsiz
Nebahat Çehre as Altinay
Pouri Banayi as Gülnaz (credited as Puri Banai)
Birsen Ayda as Ebrise
Altan Günbay as Cabbar
Humayun Tebrizyan as Köse 
Milton Reid as Dev

References

External links
 

1970 films
Films directed by Halit Refiğ
Turkish historical adventure films
Turkish fantasy films
1970s historical fantasy films
Historical fantasy films
1970 multilingual films
1970s fantasy action films
1970s Persian-language films
Films shot in Iran
Turkish multilingual films
1970s Turkish-language films
Turkish swashbuckler films
Turkish films about revenge
Iranian multilingual films
Films with live action and animation